Hawarden may refer to:

Places
 Hawarden, Wales
 Hawarden, Iowa, United States
 Hawarden, New Zealand
 Hawarden, Saskatchewan, Canada

People
 Clementina Hawarden, Anglo-Irish Victorian photographer
 Edward Hawarden, English Roman Catholic theologian
 John Hawarden (fl. 1548–1565), Oxford college principal
 Tim Hawarden, South African astrophysicist

See also
 Viscount Hawarden, Title of the Irish Peerage derived from the Hawarden estates in County Tipperary